Harry Parkinson (10 June 1882 – 25 December 1955) was an Australian cricketer. He played six first-class matches for Tasmania between 1908 and 1914.

See also
 List of Tasmanian representative cricketers

References

External links
 

1882 births
1955 deaths
Australian cricketers
Tasmania cricketers
Cricketers from Tasmania